is a national highway connecting Urakawa, Hokkaido and Kushiro, Hokkaido in Japan.

Route description
Length: 
Origin: Urakawa (originates at junction with Route 235 and Route 236)
Terminus: Kushiro
Major cities: Kushiro

Passes through
Hokkaido
Hidaka Subprefecture
Urakawa District, Hokkaido
 Urakawa, Hokkaido
Samani District, Hokkaido
 Samani, Hokkaido
Horoizumi District, Hokkaido
 Erimo, Hokkaido
Tokachi Subprefecture
Hiroo District, Hokkaido
 Hiroo, Hokkaido
 Taiki, Hokkaido
Nakagawa (Tokachi) District, Hokkaido
 Makubetsu, Hokkaido
Hiroo District, Hokkaido
 Taiki, Hokkaido
Tokachi District, Hokkaido
 Urahoro, Hokkaido
Kushiro Subprefecture
Kushiro, Hokkaido
Shiranuka District, Hokkaido
 Shiranuka, Hokkaido
Kushiro, Hokkaido

Intersects with

Hokkaido
Hidaka Subprefecture
Route 235 and Route 236Overlap with Route 236
Route 236
Hokkaidō Highway 389
Hokkaidō Highway 233
Hokkaidō Highway 34
Tokachi Subprefecture
Hokkaidō Highway 1071
Hokkaidō Highway 315
Hokkaidō Highway 987
Hokkaidō Highway 414
Hokkaidō Highway 1037
Route 236Overlap with Route 236
Route 236
Hokkaidō Highway 501
Hokkaidō Highway 55
Hokkaidō Highway 319
Hokkaidō Highway 318
Hokkaidō Highway 912
Hokkaidō Highway 911
Route 38Overlap with Route 38
Kushiro Subprefecture
Hokkaidō Highway 25

References

  Japanese Wikipedia article

336
Roads in Hokkaido